Lipotriches notiomorpha is a species of bee in the genus Lipotriches, of the family Halictidae. It is endemic to Sri Lanka, where it was first found from Anuradhapura district.

References

External links

Halictidae
Endemic fauna of Sri Lanka
Insects of Sri Lanka
Hymenoptera of Asia
Insects described in 1978